Klub Sepakbola Internasional Banten (simply known as Inter Banten) is an Indonesian football club based in Serang, Banten. They scheduled compete in the Liga 3 season 2022–23.

References

External links
 

Football clubs in Indonesia
Sport in Banten
Football clubs in Banten
Association football clubs established in 2022
2022 establishments in Indonesia